Frank G. Zalom is an American entomologist at University of California, Davis and an Elected Fellow of the American Association for the Advancement of Science.

Zalom, together with Mysore Sudarshana and Brian Bahder, is credited with discovering that the three cornered alfalfa treehopper (Ceresa festina), previously considered a minor vineyard pest, is a vector for grapevine red blotch disease in 2016.

References

Year of birth missing (living people)
Living people
Fellows of the American Association for the Advancement of Science
American entomologists
Arizona State University alumni
University of California, Davis alumni
Fellows of the California Academy of Sciences